Belören is a town (belde) and municipality in the Gölbaşı District, Adıyaman Province, Turkey. The village is populated by Turks and had a population of 2,015 in 2021. Both Alevism and Sunni Islam are present in the village.

References

Towns in Turkey
Populated places in Adıyaman Province
Gölbaşı District, Adıyaman